Sylvania is a town in DeKalb County, Alabama, United States. It incorporated in October 1967. At the 2010 census the population was 1,837, up from 1,186 in 2000. Sylvania is located atop Sand Mountain.

Geography
Sylvania is located north of the center of DeKalb County at  (34.558304, -85.796154). Alabama State Route 75 passes through the town limits, leading northeast to Henagar and southwest to Rainsville.

Demographics

2000 census
At the 2000 census there were 1,186 people, 485 households, and 354 families living in the town. The racial makeup of the town was 96.37% White, 0.08% Black or African American, 1.18% Native American, 0.08% Asian, 0.51% from other races, and 1.77% from two or more races. 0.67% of the population were Hispanic or Latino of any race.
Of the 485 households 34.0% had children under the age of 18 living with them, 59.2% were married couples living together, 10.5% had a female householder with no husband present, and 27.0% were non-families. 25.2% of households were one person and 11.8% were one person aged 65 or older. The average household size was 2.45 and the average family size was 2.89.

The age distribution was 24.3% under the age of 18, 9.8% from 18 to 24, 27.5% from 25 to 44, 25.3% from 45 to 64, and 13.2% 65 or older. The median age was 38 years. For every 100 females, there were 91.6 males. For every 100 females age 18 and over, there were 88.7 males.

The median household income was $28,553 and the median family income  was $35,000. Males had a median income of $28,681 versus $19,620 for females. The per capita income for the town was $15,561. About 13.6% of families and 16.6% of the population were below the poverty line, including 19.9% of those under age 18 and 30.7% of those age 65 or over.

2010 census
At the 2010 census there were 1,837 people, 674 households, and 505 families living in the town. The racial makeup of the town was 86.7% White, 0.2% Black or African American, 0.8% Native American, 0.2% Asian, 7.5% from other races, and 4.4% from two or more races. 11.2% of the population were Hispanic or Latino of any race.
Of the 674 households 36.2% had children under the age of 18 living with them, 57.9% were married couples living together, 13.6% had a female householder with no husband present, and 25.1% were non-families. 21.2% of households were one person and 6.7% were one person aged 65 or older. The average household size was 2.73 and the average family size was 3.18.

The age distribution was 27.8% under the age of 18, 10.0% from 18 to 24, 26.6% from 25 to 44, 24.7% from 45 to 64, and 10.9% 65 or older. The median age was 33.8 years. For every 100 females, there were 97.5 males. For every 100 females age 18 and over, there were 92.5 males.

The median household income was $34,079 and the median family income  was $40,648. Males had a median income of $35,417 versus $27,857 for females. The per capita income for the town was $17,793. About 22.3% of families and 24.0% of the population were below the poverty line, including 34.1% of those under age 18 and 18.0% of those age 65 or over.

2020 census

As of the 2020 United States census, there were 1,790 people, 829 households, and 648 families residing in the town.

Education
 Sylvania High School, a member of the DeKalb County School System. Their mascot is “The Rams”, with gold and green as their school colors.

References

External links
Town of Sylvania official website

Towns in DeKalb County, Alabama
Towns in Alabama